Vegar Eggen Hedenstad (born 26 June 1991) is a Norwegian professional footballer who plays as a right-back for Eliteserien club Vålerenga. Hedenstad has been capped at international level for Norway

Club career
Hedenstad was born in Elverum and played for Elverum Fotball where he made his senior debut in the Third Division in 2006, at the age of 14 and became the youngest ever senior player at the team. At the age of 16, Hedenstad played on a team consisting of local talents in a show-match against HamKam, and HamKam's head coach Arne Erlandsen approached Hedenstad immediately after the match and stated that he wanted to sign him. However, Hedenstad signed for Stabæk and joined the club ahead of the 2008 season.

Hedenstad made his debut in Tippeligaen on 7 June 2008 against Strømsgodset and made a total of three appearances during the 2008 season when Stabæk won Tippeligaen, enough to earn him a championship-medal. The next season, Hedenstad was playing regularly on the team that finished third in Tippeligaen and won bronze-medals.

On 17 July 2012, Hedenstad signed a four-year deal with Bundesliga outfit SC Freiburg, and became the second footballer from Elverum in the Bundesliga, after Terje Olsen who played for Bayer Leverkusen in the 1980s. He was injured after five minutes in his first match for Freiburg, during the team's pre-season tour to Austria. Hedenstad made his debut in the Bundesliga when Freiburg lost 2–0 to Bayer Leverkusen on 1 September 2012.

On 4 July 2014, Hedenstad joined Eintracht Braunschweig on a one-year loan deal.

Hedenstad joined FC St. Pauli in the summer 2016.

In February 2017 he joined Rosenborg. In December 2020 it was announced Hedenstad would leave Rosenborg after 4 seasons after his contract expired at the end of the year.

On 5 January 2021, Hedenstad signed for Süper Lig club Fatih Karagümrük.

International career
Hedenstad has represented Norway at every level from under-15 to under-23, and was playing regularly as a right back for the under-21 team in the 2013 UEFA European Under-21 Football Championship qualification, when the team qualified for the championship.
 
Hedenstad made his debut for the national team when he replaced Lars Christopher Vilsvik at half time in a 1–1 friendly draw against Denmark on 15 January 2012. He was again called up for the friendly match against Hungary in October 2012. In the absence of John Arne Riise Hedenstad played the whole match on the left back to great acclaim, with the pundits stating that Hedenstad would soon replace Riise as Norway's regular starting left-back.

Personal life
In January 2009, after his girlfriend Charlotte received news that she was dying of cancer and only had a few months left to live, Hedenstad took a break from professional football. Only 17 at the time, he later described those last few months with her as "fantastic", because they were able to spend them together. In May 2012, Hedenstad experienced another tragic death, when his teammate at Stabæk, Tor Marius Gromstad, died at the age of 22 from an accidental fall at a construction site.

Career statistics

Club

Honours
Stabæk
Norwegian League: 2008

Rosenborg
Norwegian League: 2017, 2018
Norwegian Football Cup: 2018

References

1991 births
Living people
People from Elverum
Norwegian footballers
Association football fullbacks
Association football midfielders
Norway international footballers
Norway under-21 international footballers
Norway youth international footballers
Stabæk Fotball players
Eliteserien players
SC Freiburg players
Eintracht Braunschweig players
FC St. Pauli players
Rosenborg BK players
Fatih Karagümrük S.K. footballers
Bundesliga players
2. Bundesliga players
Süper Lig players
Norwegian expatriate footballers
Norwegian expatriate sportspeople in Germany
Expatriate footballers in Germany
Norwegian expatriate sportspeople in Turkey
Expatriate footballers in Turkey
Sportspeople from Innlandet